SRV-300 is a deep-submergence rescue vehicle that is rated to dive up to . It was built by DRASS (Livorno) for the Marina Militare, and is capable of descending to  carrying 12 passengers in addition to crew. SRV-300 is hosted by Anteo, berthed at La Spezia.

SRV-300 supplanted the Breda MSM-1S USEL deep-submergence rescue vehicle, in 2002 and since 2004 it has been fitted with a Simrad EM-1002 multibeam echo-sounder. Further upgrades in 2010 introduced air portability.

There is a new version under development, the SRV-650, with a maximum depth of 650 m (2 133 ft) and with a hosting capacity of 15 people.

See also

References

Deep-submergence rescue vehicles
Submarines of the Italian Navy
Ships built in Livorno
1999 ships